John Richard Lowndes French, 2nd Earl of Ypres (6 July 1881 – 5 April 1958) was the son of the British field marshal and the first commander of the British Expeditionary Force (BEF) in World War I Sir John French.

He was born near Morpeth in Northumberland where his father was stationed. He followed his father by joining the army and he served with the Royal Field Artillery, but his military career was cut short following a riding accident. French was also a talented artist, something which did not endear him to his father.

He succeeded his father as 2nd Earl of Ypres following his death on 22 May 1925. During the Second World War he commanded a battalion of the Home Guard. He was succeeded by his son John.

References

Lowndes family
The Little Field Marshal by Richard Holmes

1881 births
1958 deaths
Earls of Ypres